|}

The Liverpool Hurdle is a Grade 1 National Hunt hurdle race in Great Britain which is open to horses aged four years or older. It is run at Aintree over a distance of about 3 miles and ½ furlong (3 miles and 149 yards, or 4,964 metres), and during its running there are thirteen hurdles to be jumped. The race is scheduled to take place each year at the Grand National meeting in early April.

History
The event was established in 1974, and it was originally held at Ascot. During the first part of its history it was called the Long Distance Hurdle, and it was initially contested over 3 miles. For a period it was classed at Grade 2 level.

The race was transferred to Aintree in 2004, and since then it has been named after the nearby city of Liverpool. Its original distance has been extended by 110 yards.

The Liverpool Hurdle was promoted to Grade 1 status in 2010, and it currently takes place on the final day of the three-day Grand National meeting. Prior to 2013 it was the opening race on the first day of the meeting.

The field usually includes horses which ran previously in the Stayers' Hurdle, and the last to win both races in the same year was Thistlecrack in 2016.

Records
Most successful horse (4 wins):
 Big Buck's – 2009, 2010, 2011, 2012

Leading jockey (5 wins):
 Peter Scudamore – Gaye Chance (1982), Bajan Sunshine (1985), Gaye Brief (1986), Mrs Muck (1987), Pragada (1992)

Leading trainer (5 wins):
 Martin Pipe – Pragada (1992), Sweet Glow (1994), Galant Moss (1999), Maid Equal (2001), Deano's Beeno (2003)

Winners

See also
 Horse racing in Great Britain
 List of British National Hunt races
 Recurring sporting events established in 1974  – this race is included under its original title, Long Distance Hurdle.

References

 Racing Post:

 aintree.co.uk – 2010 John Smith's Grand National Media Guide.
 pedigreequery.com – Liverpool Hurdle (Long Distance Hurdle) – Aintree.
 

National Hunt races in Great Britain
Aintree Racecourse
National Hunt hurdle races
1974 establishments in England